Mimaletis is a genus of moths in the family Geometridae described by Warren in 1894. This genus is similar to Scopula but differs in neuration of the wings and the female's antennae that are shortly and stoutly pectinated (comb like).

Species
Some species of this genus are:

Mimaletis albipennis Warren, 1905
Mimaletis humilis Warren, 1894
Mimaletis landbecki (Druce, 1910)
Mimaletis paucialbata Prout L. B., 1918
Mimaletis postica (Walker, 1869)
Mimaletis reducta Prout L. B., 1915
Mimaletis verecunda Prout L. B., 1934
Mimaletis watulekii Carcasson, 1962

References

Ennominae